TV7 (in ), also known as  El maarifa TV, is the seventh Algerian public national television channel. It is part of the state-owned EPTV group, along with TV1, TV2, TV3, TV4, TV5, TV6, TV8 and TV9.  It is an Arab language channel. TV7 is specialized in "distance education".

History
TV7 was launched on 19 May 2020, it broadcasts each day from 8 am to midnight.

References

External links
  
 

Television stations in Algeria
Television channels and stations established in 2020